A Dash of Love, also known as A Pinch of Love, is a 2017 comedy romance television film directed by Christie Will Wolf, and written by Sandra Berg (teleplay), Judith Berg (teleplay), Sib Ventress (story). It produced by the Hallmark Channel and Crown Media Family Networks, airing as the third film in the 2017 lineup of the "Countdown to Valentine's Day" seasonal programming block.

Plot 
Nikki Turner (Jen Lilley) is an aspiring chef who lands the job of her dreams when her idol Holly Hanson asks her to work at her lavish restaurant. Sure that her next big break is on the rise, she soon finds herself making one-of-a-kind meals that she taught herself to make.  And after a rough start, she soon becomes best friends with executive chef Paul Dellucci. But as peppy and considerate as Holly may seem, it turns out she has a shady side that comes out in full force when she unfairly fires Nikki and Paul just because they were eating dinner together in a spot she didn't approve of. Afterwards, Nikki and Paul decide to come together and open their own restaurant to show that their food is better. And as they commence a battle against the scheming celebrity chef, they both use their creative thinking to create some of the most delicious treats around and add their own little dash of love into the mix.

Cast  
 Jen Lilley as Nikki Turner, an optimistic girl who is creative with cooking. When the Flop Two diner closes down, she accepts a job as assistant to her idol, the famed chef, cookbook author and restaurateur Holly Hanson.
 Brendan Penny as Paul Dellucci, an executive chef to Holly Hanson. Paul has been pressuring Holly to update the menu with new and exciting dishes, she brushes off suggestions. Finally, he rent the closed Flop Two diner with Nikki, and create a three-day pop-up restaurant for Valentine's Day called Cafe Cupid.
 Peri Gilpin as Holly Hanson, the owner of a restaurant. Holly discovers Nikki's passion and allows her to use the restaurant's kitchen to practice, as long as she does not tell anyone her secret.

Reception 
Critic Mark Kermode calls this movie is a "slow build to a cute movie" and gives actress Jen Lilley a praise for her performance by saying that "You want her to succeed and have a satisfying conclusion". Just as well, the United Kingdom movie review organisation called The Movie Scene praises Hallmark Channel for the feat of this movie, saying that "they know exactly what their movies are about, they know what their audience is like, and they know how to take a familiar set up and still keep it entertaining." The reviewer states that the movie "Makes it less about the day (valentine's day) and more about the characters" and that the conclusion to the film "Not only gives a happy ending, but makes the story more realistic".

References 

2017 television films
2017 films
2017 romantic comedy films
American television films
American romantic comedy films
Hallmark Channel original films
2010s English-language films
2010s American films